Jegunovce is a municipality in the northwest of North Macedonia. Jegunovce is also the name of the village where the municipal seat is found. Jegunovce Municipality is part of the Polog Statistical Region.

Geography
The municipality borders Kosovo to the north and east, the city of Skopje to the southeast, Tearce Municipality to the west, Želino Municipality to the south and Tetovo Municipality to the southwest.

History
By the 2003 territorial division of the republic, the rural Vratnica Municipality was attached to Jegunovce Municipality.

Demographics
The municipality has 8,895 inhabitants, according to the 2021 census. Ethnic groups in the municipality:

References

 
Polog Statistical Region
Municipalities of North Macedonia